Pattampoochi may refer to:
 Pattampoochi (1975 film), an Indian Tamil-language drama film
 Pattampoochi (2022 film), an Indian Tamil-language period psychological action thriller film